The 1954–55 OB I bajnokság season was the 18th season of the OB I bajnokság, the top level of ice hockey in Hungary. Six teams participated in the league, and Kinzsi SE Budapest won the championship.

Regular season

1st place game 
 Kinizsi SE Budapest - Postás Budapest 4:2

External links
 Season on hockeyarchives.info

Hun
OB I bajnoksag seasons
1954–55 in Hungarian ice hockey